Kim Brooks Williams (December 7, 1954 – January 25, 2008) was a professional American football player who played tight end in the National Football League (NFL) for seven seasons for the New Orleans Saints, Chicago Bears, and New England Patriots.

References

1954 births
2008 deaths
American football tight ends
New Orleans Saints players
Chicago Bears players
New England Patriots players
North Carolina Tar Heels football players